Elmer is computational tool for multi-physics problems. It has been developed by CSC in collaboration with Finnish universities, research laboratories and industry. Elmer FEM solver is free and open-source software, subject to the requirements of the GNU General Public License (GPL), version 2 or any later.

Elmer includes physical models of fluid dynamics, structural mechanics, electromagnetics, heat transfer and acoustics, for example. These are described by partial differential equations which Elmer solves by the Finite Element Method (FEM).

Elmer comprises several different parts:
 ElmerGrid – A mesh conversion tool, which can be used to convert differing mesh formats into Elmer-suitable meshes.
 ElmerGUI – A graphical interface which can be used on an existing mesh to assign physical models, this generates a "case file" which describes the problem to be solved. Does not show the whole ElmerSolver functionality in GUI.
 ElmerSolver – The numerical solver which performs the  finite element calculations, using the mesh and case files. 
 ElmerPost – A post-processing/visualisation module. (Development stopped in favour of other post-processing tools such as ParaView, VisIt, etc.)

The different parts of Elmer software may be used independently. Whilst the main module is the ElmerSolver tool, which includes many sophisticated features for physical model solving, the additional components are required to create a full workflow. For pre- and post-processing other tools, such as Paraview can be used to visualise the output.

The software runs on Unix and Windows platforms and can be compiled on a large variety of compilers, using the CMake building tool. The solver can also be used in a multi-host parallel mode on platforms that support MPI. Elmer's parallelisation capability is one of the strongest sides of this solver.

External links

See also 

 Finite Element Method
 List of finite element packages

References 

Numerical software
Free computer-aided design software
Finite element software for Linux
Free software programmed in Fortran
Free science software
Computational physics
Engineering software that uses Qt
Computer-aided engineering software for Linux
Software that uses Tk (software)